Westminster Hall and Burying Ground is a graveyard and former church located at 519 West Fayette Street (at North Greene Street) in Baltimore, Maryland, United States. It occupies the southeast corner of West Fayette and North Greene Street on the west side of downtown Baltimore. It sits across from the Baltimore VA hospital and is the burial site of Edgar Allan Poe (1809–1849). The complex was declared a national historic district in 1974.

History
The graveyard was established in January 1787 by the First Presbyterian Church of Baltimore, from land on the westside of old Baltimore Town purchased by a committee of noted laymen consisting of William Smith, John Boyd, and William Patterson (locally prominent merchant, civic activist, owner of future Patterson Park, and father of noted Baltimore socialite/debutante Elizabeth ("Betsy") Patterson, (1785-1879), who married Jerome Bonaparte in 1803, brother of the French Emperor Napoleon I)  from Col. John Eager Howard, (1752-1827), former commander of the famous "Maryland Line" regiment of the Continental Army in the American Revolution. Col. Howard owned the estate and mansion of "Belvidere", in what was called "Howard's Woods", north of Baltimore Town (later to become the neighborhood of Mount Vernon-Belvedere, and the site of the landmark Washington Monument).  First Presbyterian,  a congregation of socially and economically elite local Presbyterians and Reformed Protestants, then was located in downtown Baltimore since its founding in 1761 at the northwest corner of East Fayette Street at North Street (later Guilford Avenue) in a landmark twin-spired Georgian architecture-Federal style architecture structure from 1790 to 1795. Over the next 60 years, the "Burying Grounds" (or cemetery) became the final resting place for many important and influential merchants, politicians, statesmen, and dozens of veterans (officers and soldiers) of the American Revolutionary War and War of 1812 who were citizens of the burgeoning and soon-to-be, the third largest city in America - Baltimore.

Today, this "who's who" of early Baltimore is overshadowed by the later presence of the promising writer, poet and author Edgar Allan Poe, who was buried here in October 1849, following his sudden and mysterious death after being found on the street near East Lombard Street in a sick and semi-conscious state wearing unfamiliar clothes. Poe was taken to the Church Home and Infirmary on Broadway (between East Fayette and Baltimore Streets on "Washington Hill"), where he died four days later. He was interred in the old Western Burying Grounds of the First Presbyterian Church. Some time later a small stone was erected at the plot in the southeastern corner of the cemetery, through the efforts of his relative Neilson Poe.  By a year later, a substantial church was planned to be erected over the grounds built upon supporting brick and stone arches to preserve the resting places of those interred below. The new Westminster Presbyterian Church sponsored by the earlier parishes of First Church and the newer Franklin Street Presbyterian Church, along with the Presbytery of Baltimore was organized and dedicated in July 1852.

Because of his subsequent growing literary fame as the 19th Century progressed following his death, a resolution was offered by Prof. John Basil, Jr., principal of the Number 8 Grammar School, and was adopted appointing a committee of five—Professors Basil, (Thomas D. Baird and J.J.G. Webster (of the Central High School of Baltimore, (later renamed in 1866 as the Baltimore City College), along with Misses Veeder and Wise -- "to devise some means best adapted in their judgment to perpetuate the memory of one who has contributed so largely to American literature" and a subscription was taken up in October 1865 by several leaders and members of the Public School Teachers Association. Numerous activities to raise further funds were held for some time by the pupils and the teachers of the Baltimore City Public Schools, including various entertainments by the young ladies of the Western and Eastern Female High Schools, under the direction of Miss S. A. Rice. By March 1871 the "Poe Memorial Fund" amounted to about $587.00. Then a new committee of Profs. Elliott (City College), Kerr and Hamilton and Misses Rice and Baer, professors of English and Literature at the Western-Eastern High Schools, was appointed and by April 1872, resolved to apply the monies so collected to erection of a monument over Poe's grave. By September 1874,  with the estate of the late Principal Thomas Baird of the City College being donated consisting of $627.55, the architect of the new Baltimore City Hall on Holliday Street, Mr. George A. Frederick, was requested to design a suitable stone monument, which later ran over the expected cost, however the balance was made up by a generous donation from a Philadelphian, Mr. George W. Childs, of $650.00. The monument was then carved by local sculptor and stonemason Hugh Sisson. Poe's body was exhumed and moved to the new more prominent northwestern site near the cemetery entrance gate at the corner of North Greene and West Fayette Streets. The monument was dedicated November 17, 1875 in the presence of a large concourse of spectators with addresses by Profs. William Elliott, Jr., H.E. Shepherd, and the locally famous civic activist, author-artist and orator John H. B. Latrobe, and representatives of several other public schools, colleges and institutions.  The design of the monument consists of a pedestal (or die block) with an ornamental cap wholly of marble, resting on two marble slabs, and a granite base. The front of the die block bears a medallion portrait of the author-poet by the sculptor Volck, while on the western side appear the lines of inscription: "Edgar Allan Poe:  born Jan. 20, 1809; died Oct. 7, 1849."

Annual observances on his birth and death dates at his grave side are still conducted to this day, attended by the WHT officials, Presbyterian Church clergy and members of several literary, educational and historical societies (such as the Poe Society of Baltimore), representatives of the several Baltimore City public high schools whose predecessors sponsored the Monuments over 140 years ago (Baltimore City College with their two old literary and debating societies: Bancroft and Carrollton-Wight, and the Western High School and the Eastern High School) and the general public and media. There is also additionally, very popular tours of the graves and catacombs below the old church and hall and activities on the festival of "Halloween" in late October. Plus there has been for decades, the legends of the "Poe Toaster" on the anniversary of his birthday in January, leaving a bottle of cognac and a single red rose by the grave mysteriously in the dark hours of night, until suddenly stopping a few years ago,

In July 1852, Westminster Presbyterian Church was erected overtop the graveyard, its brick piers straddling gravestones and burial vaults to create what later Baltimoreans referred to as the "catacombs." For years, it was thought that the Gothic Revival-style Westminster Presbyterian Church was built in response to a new city ordinance prohibiting cemeteries that were not adjacent to a religious structure. Research in the early 1980s by historian Michael Franch found no such ordinance—and revealed a more complex motive: The congregation hoped that the new expansion church would serve Baltimore's growing "West End"—new churches were then springing up in every corner of the city in response to a dramatic increase in population—and provide protection to an aging, old-fashioned, 18th Century-style "burying ground" that few saw as an appropriate resting place for the more up-to-date 19th Century.

Westminster Presbyterian Church lived up to its promise and ministry for several decades, but suffered a dramatic loss of congregants by the early 1900s who were moving to the outer city and its suburbs and joining additional Presbyterian and other congregations there. Even First Presbyterian and the Franklin Street congregations eventually merged in 1974, (now known as "First and Franklin Street Presbyterian Church") moving to the First Church building at the corner of Park Avenue and West Madison Streets, with the old Franklin Street building now being used by a fundamentalist Protestant congregation that however takes good care of its historic building. Revived in the 1920s by a number of new active members, the congregation continued until 1977 when the Westminster Presbyterian congregation was disbanded/disorganized and historical assets were reverted to the local Presbytery of Baltimore and arrangements were made when care of the church building and premises was assumed by the University of Maryland's School of Law, which occupies the rest of the square block to the south, southeast and east bounded by West Baltimore, North Paca, West Fayette and North Greene streets. The School of Law's city block campus is also surrounded by the urban neighborhood of the other buildings, facilities, medical center, parking garages and public squares of the various graduate schools of the University of Maryland at Baltimore's westside/downtown campus, founded in 1807. Under the auspices of the newly organized, non-profit "Westminster Preservation Trust", the "burying grounds" were cleaned up and the church was renovated for secular public use, now known as "Westminster Hall". Support and a listing has also been obtained from the Maryland Historical Trust and other heritage and tourism organizations such as the newly established efforts of the Baltimore National Heritage Area, with the National Park Service, with cooperation from the  Maryland Historical Society, the Baltimore City Historical Society, Baltimore Heritage, Preservation Maryland, and the Office of Promotion and the Arts in the Mayor's Office of the City of Baltimore plus the Baltimore City Commission for Historical and Architectural Preservation. In 2006, the Westminster Preservation Trust installed more than 20 interpretive signs around the burying ground and catacombs to provide historical and biographical information on the area.

The site has been used in an episode of Creepy Canada, with paranormal investigators from BSPR discussing its possible haunting.

Persons of note interred 

A number of famous Marylanders are interred here, including many Revolutionary patriots and veterans of the War of 1812. Other Marylanders include:

James Calhoun (1743–1816), last Mayor of Baltimore Town and first Mayor of the City of Baltimore
James Morrison Harris (1817–1898), U.S. Representative
Edward Johnson (1767–1829), Mayor of Baltimore during British attack in September 1814, chair of the "Committee of Vigilance and Safety".
Philip Barton Key (1818–1859), son of Francis Scott Key, Shot and killed by Daniel E. Sickles, his lover's husband, at Lafayette Park, Washington, D.C., 27 February 1859
James McHenry (1753–1816), signer of the U.S. Constitution and Secretary of War, namesake for Fort McHenry. 
Edgar Allan Poe (1809–1849), short story writer, editor and critic
Virginia Eliza Clemm Poe (1822–1847), teen-age wife of Edgar Allan Poe
Maria Clemm (1790–1871), mother-in-law and aunt of Edgar Allan Poe
William Henry Leonard Poe (1807–1831), brother of Edgar Allan Poe
General David Poe, Sr. (1743–1816), grandfather of Edgar Allan Poe
Robert Smith (1757–1842), Secretary of the Navy, Secretary Of State, and Attorney General
Samuel Smith (1752–1839), U.S. Congressman, U.S. Senator,  and Mayor of Baltimore, and Major General, commander of Maryland Militia in the War of 1812, with overall command during the British attack in September 1814 and the Battle of Baltimore, with the fortification/defensive forces on "Loudenschlager's Hill (now "Hampstead Hill" in Patterson Park), the Bombardment of Fort McHenry and the Battle of North Point.
Samuel Sterett (1758–1833), U.S. Representative
John Sterett (1751–1787), Capt. Revolutionary War & Member of Maryland Legislature
Joseph Sterett (1773–1821), General during the War of 1812
David Harris (1753–1809), Capt. Revolutionary War & Son of John Harris, the founder of Harrisburg PA
David Stewart (1800–1858), U.S. Senator
John Stricker (1758–1825), War of 1812 Maryland Militia Brigadier General and commander at the Battle of North Point.

Edgar Allan Poe
Westminster Hall and Burying Ground is home to the grave of American author Edgar Allan Poe, arguably its most famous resident. Poe actually has two graves on this site: his original grave and a monument added in 1875. His original burial spot, towards the back of Westminster Hall, is marked by a headstone with an engraved raven. It was a family plot, lot 27, where his grandfather General David Poe Sr. and his brother Henry Leonard Poe are also buried. In 1875, a local school teacher started a "Pennies for Poe" campaign to raise money for a more appropriate monument, resulting in the large marble monument located at the front of the cemetery facing Fayette St; to this day, it is traditional for visitors to the grave to leave a penny on the monument. Poe was re-buried there along with his aunt/mother-in-law Maria Clemm. His wife Virginia died in the Bronx in 1847 and was interred in a vault. In 1885 her remains were moved to the Poe Monument and was reburied in a small bronze box to the left of the monument.

Westminster Hall is the location of the Westminster Preservation Trust annual Poe birthday celebration every January, often featuring theatrical presentations and an apple cider toast.  On Poe's birthday, January 19, an unidentified man known endearingly as the Poe Toaster visited the burying ground to make an annual tribute to Poe. The tradition seemingly ended in 2009.

Historic designation
Westminster Hall and Burying Ground was listed on the National Register of Historic Places on September 17, 1974. They are included in the Baltimore National Heritage Area.

References

External links

Westminster Hall article in Baltimore Sun
Westminster Hall official site.
Baltimore, Maryland, a National Park Service Discover Our Shared Heritage Travel Itinerary
, including photo dated 1997, at Maryland Historical Trust

Cemeteries in Baltimore
Protestant Reformed cemeteries
Cemeteries on the National Register of Historic Places in Maryland
Edgar Allan Poe
Churches on the National Register of Historic Places in Maryland
Presbyterian churches in Maryland
Churches in Baltimore
Baltimore National Heritage Area
Historic districts on the National Register of Historic Places in Maryland
Properties of religious function on the National Register of Historic Places in Baltimore